Viðskiptablaðið (English: The Business Paper) is an Icelandic newspaper focusing on business, economy, and national affairs.

History
The paper was founded in 1994 as a weekly paper on business and economy affairs. Its first editor was Óli Björn Kárason. In January 2004, it started publishing twice a week and in February 2007 four times a week. In November 2008 it was changed again to a weekly newspaper. The same month, the paper was bought by Myllusetur ehf. that also publishes Fiskifréttir and the Frjáls Verslun.

See also 
 List of newspapers in Iceland

References

External links 
 Viðskiptablaðið website

Publications established in 1994
Weekly newspapers published in Iceland
1994 establishments in Iceland
Icelandic-language newspapers